Reinikainen is a Finnish surname. Notable people with the surname include:

 Janne Reinikainen (actor) (born 1969), Finnish actor
 Tepa Reinikainen (born 1976), Finnish shot putter
 Janne Reinikainen (footballer) (born 1981), Finnish football player
 Alexia Reinikainen (comedian),(born ?) Finnish-American comedian  

Finnish-language surnames